France competed at the 1996 Summer Olympics in Atlanta, United States. 299 competitors, 197 men and 102 women, took part in 183 events in 25 sports.

Medalists

Archery

In France's sixth appearance in modern Olympic archery, defending gold medallist Sebastien Flute was defeated in the first round of elimination. Fellow veteran Severine Bonal was also defeated early, while Lionel Torres reached the quarterfinal. The men's team was defeated in the first round.

Athletics

Men's track & road

Men's field

Women's track & road

Women's field

Combined events
Decathlon

Badminton

Beach volleyball

Boxing

Canoeing

Men

Cycling

Road
Men

Women

Track

Points race

Sprint

Pursuit

Time trial

Mountain Bike

Diving

Equestrian

Fencing

15 fencers, 9 men and 6 women, represented France in 1996.

Men

Women

Football

Men's tournament 

Team roster
Head coach: Raymond Domenech

Groupstage

Quarterfinal

Gymnastics

Artistic

Men
Team

Individual finals

Women
Team

Individual finals

Rhythmic
Individual

Group

Handball

Men's tournament

Roster

 Eric Amalou
 Grégory Anquetil
 Stéphane Cordinier
 Yohan Delattre
 Christian Gaudin

 Stéphane Joulin
 Guéric Kervadec
 Denis Lathoud
 Pascal Mahé
 Bruno Martini

 Gaël Monthurel
 Raoul Prandi
 Jackson Richardson
 Philippe Schaaf
 Stéphane Stoecklin
 Frédéric Volle

Preliminary round

Semifinal

Bronze medal game

Judo

Men

Women

Modern pentathlon

Rowing

Men

Women

Qualification legend: FA=Final A (medal); FB=Final B (non-medal); FC=Final C (non-medal); FD=Final D (non-medal); SA/B=Semifinal A/B; SC/D=Semifinal C/D; R=Repechage

Sailing

Men

Women

Open
Fleet racing

Mixed racing

Shooting

Men

Women

Swimming

Men

Key:FA – Qualify to A final (medal); FB – Qualify to B final (non-medal)

Women

Key:FA – Qualify to A final (medal); FB – Qualify to B final (non-medal)

Synchronized swimming

Table tennis

Tennis

Men

Women

Weightlifting

Men

Wrestling

Freestyle

Greco-Roman

Notes

References

Nations at the 1996 Summer Olympics
1996
Summer Olympics